Brujos de Guayama is a Puerto Rican professional basketball team of the Baloncesto Superior Nacional based in Guayama, Puerto Rico. Despite being in the league since 1971, the team has not won any BSN Championships but have made 2 finals appearances being a runner-up 2 times (1991, 1994).

History
The team was founded in 1971. In the 1991 season the Brujos' lost to the Atleticos de San German in the finals. In the 1994 season the Brujos' again lost to the Atleticos de San German in the finals.

Players

Current roster

<ref>

Notable players
Kyle Gibson (born 1987), basketball player for Hapoel Galil Elyon of the Israeli Basketball Premier League

Major trophies and awards

Domestic
BSN Championship:
 Runner-up (2): 1991, 1994}

References

External links
Puerto Rican League official website 
BSN teams
Basketball teams established in 1971
1971 establishments in Puerto Rico